Giacchino is an Italian surname. Notable people with the surname include:

Anthony Giacchino (born 1969), American documentary filmmaker
Michael Giacchino (born 1967), American composer of music for films, television, and video games

See also
Giachino

Italian-language surnames